The 2018–19 Texas–Rio Grande Valley Vaqueros women's basketball team represented the University of Texas Rio Grande Valley during the 2018–19 NCAA Division I women's basketball season. This was head coach Lane Lord's first season along with the third under the UTRGV label. The Vaqueros played their home games at the UTRGV Fieldhouse and were members of the Western Athletic Conference. They finished 18–15 overall, 10–6 in WAC to finish in third place. They advanced to the championship game of the WAC women's tournament where they lost New Mexico State. They received an invitation of the WBI where they lost to North Texas in the first round.

Roster

Schedule

|-
!colspan=9 style=| Non-conference regular season

|-
!colspan=9 style=| WAC regular season

|-
!colspan=9 style=| WAC Women's Tournament

|-
!colspan=9 style=| WBI

See also
2018–19 Texas–Rio Grande Valley Vaqueros men's basketball team

References

UT Rio Grande Valley Vaqueros women's basketball seasons
Texas-Rio Grande Valley
Texas-Rio Grande